Gary, formerly Miller, was a train station in the Miller Beach neighborhood of Gary, Indiana.

History
The station site was established when the Baltimore and Ohio Railroad arrived here in 1874. It was referred to as Millers or Miller after the original settlement. The railroad's main passenger station in the area was Gary Union Station.

Amtrak began stopping trains here in 1982 when the Cardinal was reactivated. The Cardinal was rerouted through Indianapolis on April 27, 1986, ending service to the station. Gary would continue see Amtrak service via the daily Calumet at the train station at 5th and Chase until 1991.

Location

References

Former Amtrak stations in Indiana
Former Baltimore and Ohio Railroad stations
Transportation in Gary, Indiana
Railway stations in Lake County, Indiana
Railway stations in the United States opened in 1982
Railway stations closed in 1986
Repurposed railway stations in the United States